Edwin Viruet (born 20 August 1950 in New York) is a retired professional boxer from Puerto Rico. His brother Adolfo was also a professional boxer.

Viruet made his professional debut in 1969. Among his early opponents were Saoul Mamby, a future world light-welterweight champion, against whom he earned a draw; and Alfredo Escalera, a future world super featherweight champion, against whom he won a decision. Viruet also defeated Vilomar Fernandez.

In 1975, Viruet was matched with Roberto Durán, the reigning world lightweight champion, in a non-title fight. Viruet lost by a unanimous decision. Two years later he fought Durán again, this time with Durán's world title on the line, and again lost a unanimous decision.

Viruet continued to fight top contenders, losing to Esteban De Jesús and Edwin Rosario but defeating Josue Marquez by tenth round knockout. He finally retired in 1983.

References

External links 
 

1950 births
Living people
Lightweight boxers
Puerto Rican male boxers